The Football NSW 2013 season was the first season under the new competition format in New South Wales.  The competition consisted of four divisions across the State of New South Wales, created from the teams in the previous structure. The overall premier for the new structure qualified for the National Premier Leagues finals series, competing with the other state federation champions in a final knockout tournament to decide the National Premier Leagues Champion for 2013.

League Tables

2013 National Premier League NSW Men's 1

The National Premier League New South Wales 2013 season was played over 22 rounds, from March to August 2013.

Finals

2013 National Premier League NSW Men's 2

The 2013 National Premier League NSW Men's 2 was the first edition of the new NPL NSW 2 as the second level domestic association football competition in New South Wales. 12 teams competed, all playing each other twice for a total of 22 rounds, with the top team at the end of the year being promoted to the NPL NSW Men's 1 competition.

Finals

2013 NSW State League Division 1

The 2013 NSW State League Division 1 was the first edition of the State League to be incorporated under the National Premier Leagues banner. 12 teams competed, all playing each other twice for a total of 22 rounds. At the end of the season, one team was promoted from the State League Division 2, with one team relegated to the State League Division 1.

Finals

2013 NSW State League Division 2

The 2013 NSW State League Division 2 was the first edition of the State League to be incorporated under the National Premier Leagues banner. 11 teams competed, all playing each other twice for a total of 20 matches. At the end of the season, one team was promoted from the State League Division 2, with one team relegated from the State League Division 1.

Finals

Awards 
The end of year awards were presented on 27 September 2013 at Rosehill Gardens Grand Pavilion.

National Premier Leagues NSW Men's / Women's Premier League

National Premier Leagues NSW Men's 2

References

2013 in Australian soccer